West Usk Lighthouse is a Grade II-listed building on the Severn Estuary at the mouth of the River Usk south of the city of Newport, South Wales.

History
The lighthouse was the first to be built by renowned Scottish civil engineer James Walker in 1821. Amongst other projects, Walker went on to build another 21 lighthouses. The land around the lighthouse has been reclaimed as farmland but it stood on an island until 1856. It was decommissioned as an operational lighthouse in 1922.

The lighthouse is currently operating as a hotel. It was featured in July 2008 on an episode of the Channel 5 television series The Hotel Inspector and in 2020 on the Doctor Who twelfth series episode "Fugitive of the Judoon".

For hotel guests, a private road off the B4239 (Lighthouse Road) leads to the lighthouse. Alternatively, it may be reached by a  walk along the sea wall footpath from the car park of the Lighthouse Inn on Beach Road. The lighthouse is situated next to the Pont-y-cwcw Reen.

The less substantial East Usk Lighthouse, on the opposite bank of the River Usk, is within the Newport Wetlands wildlife reserve.

See also

 List of lighthouses in Wales

References

External links
West Usk Lighthouse

Lighthouses completed in 1821
Lighthouses in Wales
Landmarks in Newport, Wales
History of Newport, Wales
Culture in Newport, Wales
Grade II listed buildings in Newport, Wales
Grade II listed lighthouses
Coast of Newport, Wales